Euchontha anomala is a moth of the family Notodontidae first described by Louis Beethoven Prout in 1918. It is found in Brazil and Peru.

References

Moths described in 1918
Notodontidae of South America